The median portion of the wall of the forebrain consists of a thin lamina, the lamina terminalis, which stretches from the interventricular foramen (Foramen of Monro) to the recess at the base of the optic stalk (optic nerve) and contains the vascular organ of the lamina terminalis, which regulates the osmotic concentration of the blood. The lamina terminalis is immediately anterior to the tuber cinereum; together they form the pituitary stalk.

The lamina terminalis can be opened via endoscopic neurosurgery in an attempt to create a path that cerebrospinal fluid can flow through when a person has hydrocephalus and when it is not possible to perform an Endoscopic third ventriculostomy, but the effectiveness of this technique is not certain.

This is the rostral end (tip) of the neural tube (embryological central nervous system) in the early weeks of development. Failure of the lamina terminalis to close properly at this stage of development will result in anencephaly or meroencephaly.

Additional images

See also
 Hypothalamus
 Vascular organ of lamina terminalis
 Cistern of lamina terminalis

References

External links

Neuroanatomy